Gaudinia is a genus of Mediterranean plants in the grass family.

The genus name is a tribute to Swiss botanist Jean François Aimé Théophile Philippe Gaudin (1766-1833).

 Species
 Gaudinia coarctata - Azores
 Gaudinia fragilis - Mediterranean + nearby regions from Portugal + Morocco to Turkey
 Gaudinia hispanica  - Spain
 Gaudinia maroccana - Morocco

 formerly included
see Helictochloa Ventenata  
 Gaudinia biebersteinii - Ventenata macra 
 Gaudinia fragilis - Ventenata macra 
 Gaudinia planiculmis - Helictochloa planiculmis 
 Gaudinia tenuis - Ventenata dubia

References

Pooideae
Poaceae genera